The parish of Christ Church is one of eleven historic political divisions of Barbados. Christ Church has survived by name as one of the original six parishes created in 1629 by Governor Sir William Tufton.

The parish contains the Sir Grantley Adams International Airport as well as the last remaining mangrove swamp in the country, the Graeme Hall Nature Sanctuary. Under Barbados's historic vestry, the main parish church was originally seated near Dover. After it and the courtyard were destroyed by flood in 1669, the main parish church moved to Oistins area, becoming the main town and former capital of the parish. The South Point Lighthouse is located in South Point, Christ Church, between Atlantic Shores and Green Garden, also in Christ Church.

Another notable area of Christ Church is Saint Lawrence Gap, which is the most lively tourist area on the island. Many of the taverns and clubs in St. Lawrence are frequented by locals and tourists alike.

Geography

Populated places
The parish contains the following towns, villages, localities, settlements, communities and hamlets:

Parishes bordering Christ Church

 Saint George - North
 Saint Michael - West
 Saint Philip - East

Defined Boundaries

with St. George: – Starting from the meeting point of the parishes of St. George, St. Philip and Christ Church and proceeding in a generally westerly and south-westerly direction along Highway 5 to its junction at South District with the unclassified road leading to Edgerton and Staple Grove; then in a southerly direction along this road to its junction about 250 metres south of the entrance to Edgerton Plantation with a track; then in a westerly direction along this track for approximately 750 metres to its junction with another track; then in a northerly
direction along this track for about 100 metres to the junction with another track, then in a westerly direction along this track for about 500 metres to its junction with another track; then along this track in a southerly direction for about 30 metres to its junction with another track; then for approximately 200 metres along this track to the junction with another track. This is the meeting point of the parishes of St. George, Christ Church and St. Michael. This point is marked by a monument.

with St. Michael: – Starting from the meeting point of the parishes of St. George, St. Michael, and Christ Church and proceeding in a southerly direction along the plantation track and the boundary between the residential development called Fort George Heights and the Kent House residential development to the junction of the boundary with the public road called Highway R; then in a westerly direction along Highway R to its junction at Wildey with the Airport to West Coast Highway; then in a southerly direction along this Highway to its merging at Clapham with the public road called Highway 6; then in a north-westerly direction along Highway 6 to its junction with the public road called Observatory Road; then in a southerly direction along Observatory Road to its junction with the public road called Fordes Road, then in a south-westerly, north-westerly and northerly direction along Fordes Road, Bonnett’s Road and Brittons New Road to its junction with Dalkeith Hill; then in a westerly direction along Dalkeith Hill to its junction with Deighton Road; then in a generally southerly direction along Deighton Road to its junction with Dayrells Road; then in a south-westerly, north-westerly and westerly direction along Dayrells Road to its junction at the Garrison with Dalkeith Road; then in a generally south-westerly direction along Dalkeith Road to its junction with the public road called Highway 7; then directly across Highway 7 and continuing in a south-westerly direction along the road leading to Gravesend Beach and directly to the sea.

with St. Philip: – Starting from the meeting point of the parishes of St. George, St. Philip and Christ Church and proceeding in an easterly direction along Highway 5 to its junction at Brereton with an unclassified road; then in a southerly direction along this road to its junction with what was once the old railway line but is now an unclassified road; then in an easterly direction along this road to its junction at Carrington Sugar Factory with another unclassified road: then in a south-easterly and southerly direction to its junction with another unclassified road; then in an easterly direction along this road to its junction north of Woodboume Plantation yard with an unclassified road leading into the plantation yard; then in a southerly and south-easterly direction (through the plantation yard) along this road to its junction with the public road called Highway 6; then directly across Highway 6 to continue along the unclassified road in a generally south-easterly direction to merge into the public road at Walronds and then continue in a generally easterly direction along the unclassified road to its junction with the unclassified road leading to Hopefield Plantation; then in a southerly direction along this road (with an eastward diversion around the buildings) to its junction west of the Airport Radar Station with another unclassified road; then eastwards along this road to its junction, east of the Airport Radar Station, with another unclassified road; then in a southerly direction along this road to its junction at Spencers with the public road called Highway 7; then in an easterly and north-easterly direction along Highway 7 to its junction with a track to the west of Rock Hall Village; then in a south-easterly, easterly and southerly direction along this track to a point on the cliff edge to the east of the Airport boundary fence (monument B.17); then in a southerly direction to the sea.

Government 

The Barbados Civil Aviation Department has its head office on the property of Grantley Adams International Airport.  The District A & C Court maintains a seat in Saint Matthias, and the District B Court in Oistins. The Barbados Police Service maintains posts located as Hastings, and Worthings; and the Barbados Postal Service at Oistins and Worthing.

Politics 
Christ Church covers five geographical constituencies for the House of Assembly:

 Christ Church-East includes Fairy Valley and Providence.
 Christ Church-East Central includes Kingsland
 Christ Church-South includes St. Lawrence and Oistins
 Christ Church-West includes Rendezvous Hill
 Christ Church-West Central includes Sargeant’s Village

Economy

The head office of REDjet was located at Grantley Adams International Airport.

Notable people
 Roston Chase, West Indian cricketer
 Shirley Chisholm, the first black woman elected to the United States House of Representatives, lived in Christ Church with her maternal grandmother for a large part of her childhood
 Sylvester Clarke, West Indian cricketer.
 Doug E. Fresh, the famous beatboxer and rapper (prominent in the 1980s and '90s) was born here
 Joel Garner, West Indian cricketer
 Jefferson Jones, born in Christ Church before moving to England, where he played cricket for Berkshire
 Jaicko Lawrence, contemporary pop music singer/songwriter
 Ashley Nurse, West Indian cricketer
 Marita Payne-Wiggins, former track and field athlete and two-time Canadian Olympic silver medallist, spent her early childhood in Christ Church
 Hallam Cole, Barbadian cricketer.

Education

Transportation

Road 
The primary roads in Christ Church to the rest of the island all originate in the Parish of St. Michael and include: the ABC Highway, H5, H6, and H7.
There is also a number of public service vehicles which serve Christ Church.

Air 
Barbados's primary airport, Grantley Adams International Airport, at Seawell.

Sea 
The town of Oistins once housed a submarine and Coast Guard station.  A jetty facility is also located for fisher-folk to unload seafood at the Oistins market and an offshore mooring is available for fuel delivery for the island.

References

External links 

 
 

 
Parishes of Barbados